Maguffin is a Soho-based London production company.

Maguffin currently represents the following directors, among others:
 Simon Hilton – music videos and documentaries, live concerts, concert projections, art films, website design, internet multimedia and archive restoration & development.
 Bird Studios – digital animation and visual effects for feature films, TV, commercials & music videos.

References

Film production companies of the United Kingdom
Mass media companies based in London